This is a list of election results for the electoral district of Baudin in South Australian elections.

Members for Baudin

Election results

Elections in the 1980s

Elections in the 1970s

References

South Australian state electoral results by district